State Road 285 (SR 285) is a north–south state road in Florida’s western panhandle.

Route description
SR 285's south end is at SR 20 in downtown Niceville. From there, it head northwest through town as Partin Drive. After several blocks, it crosses Swift Creek, heading out of Niceville. After that, it quickly crosses College Boulevard, and into Eglin Air Force Base, where it stays for most of its journey. It slowly turns more toward the north until it passes Pierce Field, a closed auxiliary field. Then, it turns back to its northwest pattern, heading towards Ramer Lookout Tower. After a few miles, it crosses the county border from Okaloosa into Walton. It intersects with Range Road 213 and Bob Sikes Road, then heads northward, hugging the border. Once it crosses Titi Creek, it leans northwest again, running alongside the Florida Trail. After a couple miles, it crosses over, interchanging with Interstate 10 at exit 70. Then, it abruptly ends at the northern border of the base, which is guided by U.S. Route 90.

Major intersections

References

External links

285
285
285